Ambattur is a state assembly constituency in Tamil Nadu, India that was newly formed after constituency delimitation. Its State Assembly Constituency number is 8. Located in Chennai district, it consists of a portion of Ambattur taluk and part of Chennai corporation. It is included in the Sriperumbudur parliamentary constituency. It is one of the 234 State Legislative Assembly Constituencies in Tamil Nadu.

Tamil Nadu

Election results

2021

2016

2011

References

Assembly constituencies of Tamil Nadu
Tiruvallur district